Reema Lamba (born 24 October 1976), better known as Mallika Sherawat, is an Indian actress who predominantly works in Hindi language films. Known for her bold onscreen attitude in films like Khwahish (2003) and  Murder (2004), Sherawat has established herself as a sex symbol and as one of the most popular celebrities in Bollywood. She then appeared in the successful romantic comedy Pyaar Ke Side Effects (2006) which won her much critical acclaim.

Since then, she has appeared in successes like Aap Ka Suroor, Welcome (both 2007) — her biggest commercial success so far — and Double Dhamaal (2011). She is one of the few Bollywood stars trying to cross over to Hollywood, with films like Hisss (2010) and Politics of Love (2011).

Early life
Sherawat was born as Reema Lamba in Moth, a small village in Hisar district of Haryana to a Jat family. Mallika's father is named Mukesh Kumar Lamba and she was born in the family of Seth Chhaju Ram, a leading Jat philanthropist. She adopted the screen name of "Mallika", meaning "empress", to avoid confusion with other actresses named Reema. "Sherawat" is her mother's maiden name She has stated that she uses her mother's maiden name because of the support that her mother has provided her.

Although relations with her family were strained when she entered the film industry, Sherawat's family has now accepted her career choice and they have reconciled.

Sherawat went to Delhi Public School, Mathura Road. She has a degree in philosophy from Miranda House, Delhi University. During the initial days of her career, she claimed to be from a very conservative small-town family and that she faced many hurdles from them in pursuing her career. However, Sherawat's family has rebutted this as a story created by her to give her an aura of a rustic girl who made it big in Bollywood.

Career
Before entering films, Sherawat appeared in television commercials with Amitabh Bachchan for BPL and Shah Rukh Khan for Santro. She also appeared in Nirmal Pandey's "Maar Dala" and Surjit Bindrakhia's "Lak Tunoo" music video. She debuted in films with a small rôle in Jeena Sirf Merre Liye where she was credited as Reema Lamba.

Sherawat attracted notice with her appearance in the 2003 film, Khwahish. In 2004, she starred in Murder, a film inspired by Hollywood's Unfaithful. She was noticed for her bold role with critic Narbir Gosal writing, "she has the chops to pull off a role like this one. She´s confident and sexy as Simran and handles her emotional scenes with dignity." She received a nomination for 'Best Actress' at the Zee Cine Awards for her performance in Murder. The film went on to become one of the biggest hits of the year.

Since then, Sherawat has been known for expressing her opinions in public, as well for the reaction to some of her statements.

In 2005, Sherawat acted in The Myth, a Chinese film, co-starring with Jackie Chan. She played an Indian girl who saves Chan's character from a river. The Myth was her first international film. Her appearance at the Cannes Film Festival to promote the film secured a lot of attention, with Time magazine's Richard Corliss calling her "the next big thing."

Her performance in the 2006 film Pyaar Ke Side Effects, co-starring Rahul Bose, won her praise from around the industry, with critic Raja Sen commenting, "Mallika steals the show with her disarming candour." and the film did moderately well at the box office.

Her first release in 2007 was Mani Ratnam's Guru, in which she performed the song "Mayya Mayya." She played a guest role in Himesh Reshammiya's Aap Ka Suroor - The Real Love Story and reportedly charged Rs. 15 million for a 10-minute appearance. Her last release of 2007 was Welcome, which did exceptionally well at the box office. Her performance received very favourable reviews with noted film critic Taran Adarsh writing, "Mallika Sherawat is electrifying."

Her 2008 releases were Ugly Aur Pagli and Maan Gaye Mughal-e-Azam. Both were unsuccessful at the box office. Sherawat's next Bollywood release was Double Dhamaal, which went on to becoming a moderate success at the box office, receiving 'above average' status at the box office, by Box Office India. She also appeared in item numbers in films such as Thank You (Razia Gundon Mein Phas Gayi), Bin Bulaye Baraati (Shalu Ke Thumkey) and in Osthe (Kalasala), which is a Tamil film. In 2012, she was featured in an item number in Tezz (Laila). Sherawat has also performed in Kismat Love Paisa Dilli, in which she will be playing a Haryanvi.

On 23 October 2013 Mallika staring reality dating show called Bachelorette India - Mere Khayalon ki Mallika was aired which was adopted from The Bachelorette to find the perfect bachelor for herself.

In 2009, Sherawat starred in a Hollywood film named Hisss, co-starring Irrfan Khan and directed by Jennifer Lynch. The story, based on the legend of Nāga, is an independent co-production between the United States and India. Endeavour Independent bought the distribution rights of Hisss. Sherawat promoted it with live snakes at the Cannes Film Festival 2010. Hisss was released in all major Indian languages on 22 October 2010.

Sherawat starred in another Hollywood film, Politics of Love, aka Love, Barack, directed by William Dear. She plays Aretha Gupta, a devoted local Obama volunteer coordinator. The film is a romantic comedy set during Barack Obama's campaign for the US presidency. A first look of Love, Barack was unveiled by Sherawat at Cannes 2010. It was released in 2011.

Sherawat won the 2008 Renaissance Artist Award at the 16th Annual Diversity Awards held in California. On 14 August 2009, Sherawat received honorary citizenship of Los Angeles in recognition of her career achievements and charitable work.

In 2012 Sherawat featured with American pop star Bruno Mars in his parody video of Salt-n-Pepa Whatta Man for the comedy website Funny or Die.

Personal life 
During her brief stint as an air hostess, Sherawat married Delhi-based pilot Karan Singh Gill in 1997. She later divorced him. She kept her marriage a secret as the stigma of divorce would've prevented her rise in Bollywood. She dated French real estate agent Cyrille Auxenfans in 2017. Sherawat is a vegan.

Activism

Sherawat has been involved with women's rights activism, discussing women's issues at the 65th United Nations DPI/NGO Conference in 2014. During the 2018 Cannes Film Festival, Sherawat had herself locked in a cage for twelve hours to support the Free A Girl India NGO.

Filmography

Film

Television

Awards and nominations

See also
 List of Hindi film actresses

References

External links

 
 

1976 births
Living people
Indian film actresses
Female models from Haryana
People from Hisar district
Delhi University alumni
21st-century Indian actresses
Actresses from Haryana
Actresses in Hindi television
Actresses in Kannada cinema
Actresses in Tamil cinema
Actresses in Hindi cinema